Mount Lowe is a mountain having two peaks, the highest rising to , on the south side of the mouth of Blaiklock Glacier in the west part of the Shackleton Range, Antarctica. It was first mapped in 1957 by the Commonwealth Trans-Antarctic Expedition and named for Wallace G. Lowe, a New Zealand photographer with the transpolar party of the expedition in 1956–58.

References

Mountains of Coats Land